Rhinolophoidea is a superfamily of bats. It contains the following families: Craseonycteridae, Hipposideridae, Megadermatidae, Rhinolophidae, Rhinonycteridae, and Rhinopomatidae. It is one of two superfamilies that comprise the suborder Yinpterochiroptera, the other being Pteropodoidea, which only contains the family Pteropodidae.

Phylogeny
The relationships within Rhinolophoidea are as follows based on a 2016 study.

References

Bat taxonomy
Mammal superfamilies